A Filetta is an all-male singing group that performs traditional music from Corsica. It's made up of Corsican singers who try to popularize the traditional Corsican Polyphony singing style. To assert its Corsican identity, the group's name refers to a kind of fern that grows on the island.

History 
For over 35 years, A Filetta has been singing traditional polyphony but also innovate. They have recorded extensively and performed internationally. In 2009, they performed in France, Germany, Poland, Ireland, Brazil, in the Baltic States, Belgium, Italy, and Austria. The year 2010 brought them to Japan, Korea and the Réunion.

Beginnings of A Filetta 
The group A Filetta was founded in October 1978 in Balagne by Michel Frassati, a young teacher, joined by Tumasgiu Nami, apiculturist. This association whose first objective was to contribute to the salvation of the Corsican oral heritage was linked to the Riacquistu mouvement. In 1981, the first album of A Filetta, Machja n'avemu un antra, is released. This first album will be followed by others, including one with children, (Sonnii Zitillini, 1987) and their first a cappella album, A' u visu di tanti (1989).

At the same time, A Filetta put a lot into cultural associations, including U Svegliu Calvese with which they launched in 1989 the first Rencontres de Chants Polyphoniques de Calvi: "A l'iniziu c'era a voce", now an established festival.

Members 
The group is currently composed of 6 singers:

 Jean-Claude Acquaviva (since 1978);
 Paul Giansily (since 1983);
 Jean-Luc Geronimi (since 1994);
 Jean Sicurani (since 1978);
 Maxime Vuillamier (since 1989);
 Ceccè Acquaviva (since 2005).

Discography 
1981 : Machja n'avemu un altra		
1982 : O'Vita
1984 : Cun tè 	
1987 : Sonnii Zitillini and In l'abbriu di e stagioni
1989 : A U VISU DI TANTI
1992 : AB'ETERNU (Diapason d'Or)
1994 : UNA TARRA CI HE (choc du monde de la musique)
1997 : PASSIONE (diapason d'or et choc du monde de la musique)
1998 : Soundtrack "Don Juan" by Jacques Weber
1999 : Soundtrack "Himalaya - l'enfance d'un chef" by Éric Valli
2000 : Soundtrack "Le libertin" by Jacques Weber
2000 : Participation at the soundtrack of "Comme un aimant" by Kamel Saleh and Akhenaton
2001 : Soundtrack "Le Peuple migrateur" by Jacques Perrin
2002 : INTANTU (Deda), reviewed as a "remarkable CD" by The Independent
2002 : DVD : "A FILETTA, voix corses" by Don Kent (Éditions Montparnasse)
2003 : SI DI MÈ
2005 : Soundtrack "Liberata" France 3
2006 : MEDEA
2008 : BRACANÀ (Deda/Harmonia Mundi distr.)
2009 : DVD "TRENT'ANNI POCU, TRENT'ANNI ASSAI" : a documentary by Cathy Rocchi and a concert at the Oratoire de Calvi, + bonus + a CD with songs. (Harmonia Mundi)
2011 : Mistico Mediterraneo with Paolo Fresu and Daniele di Bonaventura (ECM)
2011 : Di Corsica Riposu, Requiem pour deux regards with Daniele di Bonaventura
2013 : Puz/zle soundtrack for Sidi Larbi Cherkaoui's choreography with Fadia Tomb El-Hage, Kazunari Abe and Olga Wojciechowska (Eastman)
2015 : Castelli (Harmonia Mundi/World Village)

Filmography 
 1995: A Filetta, en concert - Chants et Polyphonies de Corse (Olivi)
 2002: A Filetta, voix corses (DVD) de Don Kent (Éditions Montparnasse)
 2004 : A Filetta, Di Corsica Riposu d'Ange Leccia (Camera Lucida)
 2009 : Trent'anni pocu, trent'anni assai (DVD), un documentaire de Cathy Rocchi et un concert à l'Oratoire de Calvi (Harmonia Mundi)

Awards 
Grand Prix de l'académie Charles Cros  (1995 et 2008)
Diapason d'Or (1993, 1997)
Choc du Monde de la Musique (1993, 1995, 1997)
César de la meilleure musique de film pour "Himalaya l'Enfance d'un chef" (2000)

References

Bibliography 
"A Filetta - tradition et ouverture ", by Jean-Claude Casanova - Colonna Editions, Ajaccio, 2009

External links 
Site of A Filetta
Tra Noi, Site of fans in English, Dutch, German and French
L'invitu, Site of fans in French, German and Italian
El espiritu del sur

Italian musical groups
Corsican musical groups